Dragstedt is a surname. Notable people with the surname include:

Carl Dragstedt (1895–1983), American scientist 
Lester Dragstedt (1893–1975), American surgeon